Candiani is an Italian surname. Notable people with the surname include:

Alicia Candiani (born 1953), Argentine artist
Enrico Candiani (1918–2008), Italian footballer
Leobardo Candiani (1904–1986), Mexican fencer
Mauricio Candiani (born 1972), Mexican politician and businessman

Italian-language surnames